Horizontalidad (horizontality or horizontalism) is a social relationship that advocates the creation, development, and maintenance of social structures for the equitable distribution of management power. These structures and relationships function as a result of dynamic self-management, involving the continuity of participation and exchange between individuals to achieve the larger desired outcomes of the collective whole.

Origin
As a specific term, horizontalidad is attributed to the radical movements that sprouted in December 2001, in Argentina, after the economic crisis. According to Marina Sitrin, it is a new social creation. Different from many social movements of the past, it rejected political programs, opting instead to create directly democratic spaces and new social relationship.

The related term "horizontals" arose during the anti-globalisation European Social Forum in London in 2004 to describe people organising in a style where they "aspire to an open relationship between participants, whose deliberative encounters (rather than representative status) form the basis of any decisions," in contrast to "verticals" who "assume the existence and legitimacy of representative structures, in which bargaining power is accrued on the basis of an electoral mandate (or any other means of selection to which the members of an organisation assent)".

Horizontalidad is related to the theories of anarchist communism, social ecology and libertarian municipalism, autonomist Marxism and participatory economics. According to these schools of thought, horizontality seems to be a necessary factor for real freedom because it allows personal autonomy within a framework of social equality. These approaches advocate a kind of socialist direct democracy and workers' councils (autogestion) or community/neighborhood councils.

According to Paul Mason, "the power of the horizontalist movements is, first, their replicability by people who know nothing about theory, and secondly, their success in breaking down the hierarchies that seek to contain them. They are exposed to a montage of ideas, in a way that the structured, difficult-to-conquer knowledge of the 1970s and 1980s did not allow (...) The big question for horizontalist movements is that as long as you don’t articulate against power, you’re basically doing what somebody has called "reform by riot": a guy in a hoodie goes to jail for a year so that a guy in a suit can get his law through parliament".

Practice
Neka, a participant in the unemployed workers movement of Solano, outside Buenos Aires, Argentina, described horizontalidad as:

See also

Anarchism
Autogestion
Clandestine Insurgent Rebel Clown Army
Corporative federalism
Consociationalism
Economic Democracy
General assembly (Occupy movement)
Kritarchy
Libertarian Municipalism
Meritocracy
Multicameralism
Panarchism
Participatory Economics
Pillarisation
Polycentric law
Popular assembly
Responsible autonomy
Social Ecology
Socialism
Symbolic interactionism

References

External links 
 La ocupación de Wall Street en clave argentina Lavaca, October 1st 2011.
 
 Horizontalism and the Occupy Movements. By Marina Sitrin. Dissent, Spring 2012.

Self-organization
Autonomism
Anti-globalization movement
Management cybernetics